Sasanagare Dam  is a buttress dam located in Hokkaido Prefecture in Japan. The dam is used for water supply. The catchment area of the dam is 5.4 km2. The dam impounds about 7  ha of land when full and can store 606 thousand cubic meters of water. The construction of the dam was completed in 1923.

References

Dams in Hokkaido